Pratapa is a genus of butterflies in the family Lycaenidae. The species of this genus are found in the far eastern Palearctic realm (China) and in the Indomalayan realm.

Species
 Pratapa cameria de Nicéville Sulawesi
 Pratapa deva (Moore, 1858)
 Pratapa icetas (Hewitson, 1865)
 Pratapa icetoides (Elwes, 1893)
 Pratapa ismaeli Hayashi, Schröder & Treadaway, 1983 may be Pratapa tyotaroi ssp. ismaeli Hayashi, Schröder & Treadaway, 1983 Philippines (Mindanao)
 Pratapa tyotaroi Hayashi, 1981

External links
 "Pratapa Moore, [1881]" at Markku Savela's Lepidoptera and Some Other Life Forms

 
Iolaini
Lycaenidae genera
Taxa named by Frederic Moore